Marc Sumerak (born 1978 in Solon, Ohio)  is a freelance comic book writer from Cleveland, Ohio. He graduated from Bowling Green State University in 2000 and worked as an editor at Marvel Comics before becoming a freelance writer. His credits include work on Avengers, Thor, Iron Man, Fantastic Four, Black Panther, Captain Marvel, Thunderbolts, Hulk, Sentinel, Agent X and many more. He was a member of the Marvel editorial team from 1999 to 2003, working alongside editor Tom Brevoort.

He is known for his work on Marvel Comics' all-ages Power Pack series (of which he has written seven consecutive 4-issue limited series), as well as the Eisner Award & Harvey Award nominated Franklin Richards: Son of a Genius (with co-writer Chris Eliopoulos). He is also currently providing the English translations for Spider-Man J (featured in the bi-monthly Spider-Man Family series). Other pieces he has authored include: Guardians, Marvel Age: Fantastic Four, Machine Teen, Ororo: Before the Storm and more. His first published work as a writer was the Avengers Casebook 1999. He also handled the writing process for the game Marvel Ultimate Alliance 3: The Black Order. 

Sumerak has stated that one of his main influences was the time he spent working as a costumed character at SeaWorld in Aurora, Ohio.

References

External links
 Official Home Page
 Marc's Personal Blog
 Marvel Comics Publishing Catalog
 The Turkeyhat Sweet (Sumerak is a contributor)
 Amazon.com published works list
 Toledo Blade newspaper interview
 Comic Book Resources interview
 Newsarama interview
 HeroSpy interview
 The Pulse interview

American comics writers
1978 births
Living people
Writers from Cleveland
Marvel Comics people
Marvel Comics writers
Bowling Green State University alumni